The Mosque was an art installation by Christoph Büchel at the 2015 Venice Biennale. Hosted by the Icelandic pavilion, the artist opened a functioning mosque within a disused church in Venice to bring attention to the lack of historic mosque in the city. Amidst the ensuing controversy, the installation was shut down in the interest of public safety.

Bibliography 

 
 
 
 
 
 
 
 

Contemporary art exhibitions
Installation art works
Venice Biennale exhibitions
May 2015 events in Italy
2015 in art